Zhuguang is a metro station on Shenzhen Metro's Line 7. It opened on 28 October 2016.

Station layout

Exits

References

External links
 Shenzhen Metro Zhuguang Station (Chinese)
 Shenzhen Metro Zhuguang Station (English)

Shenzhen Metro stations
Railway stations in Guangdong
Futian District
Railway stations in China opened in 2011